is the first album by the Japanese girl group Shiritsu Ebisu Chugaku (also called Ebichu for short). The album was released in Japan on June 24, 2013 on the Sony Music Entertainment Japan's label Defstar Records.

Background 
The release was announced on June 9, 2013 during a release event for the band's latest single "Te o Tsunagō / Kindan no Karma", held at Lazona Kawasaki Plaza Ruefer Square Grand Stage (in Kanagawa Prefecture). It was announced that it would be the band's "first full album" and it would contain the songs from their first four major-label singles, a cover of Yellow Magic Orchestra's "Taiso" and some newly written songs, 14 tracks in total.

The album was released in 3 editions: Limited Edition Ē (CD+DVD), Limited Edition Bī (CD+DVD), and Subculture Edition (CD). The Subculture Edition had a limited first press version.

Track listing 

(The DVD is included only into Limited Edition A and features nine karaoke videos, each track accompanied by a band member dancing.)

(The CD is included only into Limited Edition B and features a 40-minute DJ mix containing Shiritsu Ebisu Chugaku's songs since the major debut and onwards.)

Charts

References

External links 
 Shiritsu Ebisu Chugaku 1st full album Chūnin special website
 Shiritsu Ebisu Chugaku 1st album Chūnin release announcement - Shiritsu Ebisu Chugaku Official Site

Shiritsu Ebisu Chugaku albums
2013 debut albums
Defstar Records albums